The E type carriages were wooden express passenger carriage used on the railways of Victoria, Australia. Originally introduced by Victorian Railways Chairman of Commissioners Thomas James Tait for the interstate service between Melbourne, Sydney and Adelaide, these Canadian-inspired carriages remained in regular service for 85 years over the entire Victorian network.

Design
Carriages on Victorian long-distance express services at the start of the 20th century were, in comparison to the Pullman cars operated by the New South Wales Government Railways, relatively cramped and austere. Much of their external appearance was based on typical Canadian carriage design, with a clerestory roof curved at the ends, doors only at the ends of the car, and six-wheel bogies, although their interior design retained the compartment & corridor layout typical of English railway practice.

The cars were built over a steel truss underframe, with wooden bodies constructed in cedar, six-wheeled bogies with eight brake blocks each (two to the outside of the outer wheels, two each per centre wheel), and clerestory roofs to give ventilation as well as daytime lighting. Night-time lighting was initially provided with Pintsch gas. Separate drop-toilets for males and females were provided in all passenger vehicles except the dining cars, along with staff toilets in the twelve mail vans.

About three decades into their lives, 15 first-class carriages had air-conditioning added, the first (36AE) being out-shopped in December 1935. The Victorian Railways claimed it was the first such car in the British Empire, but the Canadian Pacific and the New South Wales Government Railways already had air-conditioned carriages.

Construction

Of the joint stock carriages, the first class and sleeping carriages were constructed at Newport Workshops by the Victorian Railways; the second class carriages and most of the vans were constructed by the South Australian Railways' Islington Railway Workshops. Later carriages of the E design were constructed at Newport Workshops.

The first batch of E-class carriages were built between 1906 and 1911, with 38 AVE 1st class cars, 16 ABVE 1st/2nd composite cars, 39 BVE 2nd class cars, 25 DVE guard's vans, 10 ESBV, 2 EES, and 2 EEB mail vans, 6 Sleeping cars, and 2 Parlor cars; a State Car was built in 1912, having a similar design to that of the Parlor cars. All had wooden bodies, clerestory roofs and six-wheel bogies. On his website, Peter J. Vincent notes that he suspects the 'E' classification referred to 'Express'.

All cars were re-coded in 1910, without being renumbered: AVE to AE,  ABVE to ABE, BVE to BE, DVE to CE, EEB to D, EES to DS, and ESBV to BDSE. All the BDSE cars were later converted to BE and BCE cars.  In addition to the original 144 carriages, a further 31 were built from 1919 onwards, however, three of these were replacements so the total in service never exceeded 172 at any one time.

Details

First Class sitting cars

These carriages were built from 1906 with eight compartments, each seating 6 first-class passengers for a total of 48 along with a lavatory/wash basin arrangement at either end of each carriage. In the first four carriages, two compartments at the Gentlemen's end were reserved for Smoking travellers, while another two compartments adjacent to the Ladies lavatory were reserved for ladies only; this was later reduced to one Ladies compartment, with the Non-Smoking compartment count increased from four to five.

26 cars were built and numbered 1AVE to 26AVE.  In the 1910 re-coding the class was re-lettered to AE, with the original numbers retained. Construction continued with a further twelve cars released to traffic until 1910 (Nos. 27 to 38), and a final four cars added in 1923 (Nos. 39 to 42).  Cars 5 to 10, & 39 to 42 were in Joint Stock service (shared) between Adelaide and Melbourne, on trains such as the Overland. Although all construction was at Newport, only around 25 of the carriages were constructed by the Victorian Railways; the remainder (spread fairly randomly throughout the class) were constructed at least partially by contractors in the Newport area.

Car 36AE was notable as this car was the prototype car for air conditioning carriages in VR service, the test for the "Spirit of Progress" cars. 36AE entered service 13 December 1935, after air conditioning modifications, which took seven months to complete. In 1961, it was renumbered 49BE. The car was destroyed in a derailment at Laverton during 1978.

Some cars were leased to the South Australian Railways following World War II; as of 1950 they included 4AE, 11AE, 13AE, & 14AE. In 1952 cars 7 & 8AE were sold to the South Australian Railways to become their 550 & 551. The cars were later forwarded to the Commonwealth Railways, with 550 being written off in 1993, and 551 (after other incarnations) preserved by the Ghan Preservation Society in Alice Springs. 9AE was also leased to the SAR for a period in February 1954.

In the early 1960s, some AE cars had their bogies switched with those formerly under the Spirit of Progress carriages, as those cars were converted to standard gauge. However, while the bogie frames were transferred, it is thought that the AE cars may have retained their spoked wheelsets(?). Around the same time, AE 36, 1, 3, & 12 were re-coded as BE cars 49 to 52, with their seats removed and replaced for eight per compartment, total 64. 50BE stayed in that form, though the latter two cars were converted back to AE classification in the early 1980s as numbers 51 & 52.

In 1970 car 37AE was taken off register, but in 1971 it was converted to the second HW 1 as a crew car for the Weedex train. In this form it ran around Victorian lines, while the train sprayed weed-killer onto the tracks.

1AE (still coded 50BES), 2AE, 18AE, 30AE, & 1BG are in the custodianship of the Seymour Railway Heritage Centre, along with the frame of 39AE. 12AE is currently in the care of Steamrail Victoria, and 1HW ex 37AE is stored under their care, unserviceable, in Newport Workshops East Block yard. 18AE was with the Victorian Goldfields Railway, but it was purchased by Seymour Railway Heritage Centre and moved by rail to Seymour for restoration in late 2010. The body of 24AE is used as an administration office at a community farm in Brunswick East, though reportedly in poor condition. Coordinates are 37°45'57.8"S, 144°59'03.7"E.

28AE's body was sold privately and spent some time in Warrnambool before being moved to Codrington.

Buffet & Restaurant cars

34AE was converted to a buffet car in 1937 and named Taggerty two years later. In this form a kitchen and long counter facing eighteen seats filled most of the carriage, with three first-class compartments seating the same number of passengers in the rest of the carriage. Taggerty ran in VR long-distance services, most often on the 12 noon Melbourne to Bendigo, returning on the 5:04 pm. It originally retained the dark red scheme of the Victorian Railways' passenger fleet (though with a silver roof), but was later repainted into the blue and gold scheme. The vehicle was sold in 1983 and it now resides in a park in Donald.

21AE & 26AE were intended to follow Taggerty, but this work was held off during World War II. As work had already started the vehicles could not be pressed back into service, so they spent the war in the Newport Workshops compound. In 1955 the cars were finally finished, re-entering service as air-conditioned Restaurant cars: three compartments were retained but the rest of the car stripped out, being replaced with a buffet module with an eating area. The cars were named Kiewa and Moyne respectively. A John Buckland photo of Moyne in 1958 at Dimboola shows that it was fitted with ex-Spirit of Progress bogies.

Partial-Saloon cars

In 1959 the restaurant cars Kiewa and Moyne were withdrawn as a failed experiment. They had their eating areas removed, being replaced with saloon-style seating, before re-entering service in 1961. The cars were listed in the Working Time Table as second-class vehicles sitting 64 (though two of those seats were unreserved adjacent to the men's lavatory), as the compartment seats had been replaced with four-across, eight per compartment. The result was three sets of eight seats in the compartment end, with the remaining 38 seats in a saloon format as 2+2, either side of a  hallway. The saloon area was designated a smoking area, while the compartments were restricted to non-smoking passengers. The compartment walls that had previously supported the car roof were replaced in function by four columns along the saloon section. The 'G' in the code may have indicated Grampians, a Victorian mountain range the cars would often run past, though by the mid 1970s 1BG was exclusively allocated to services on the Yarram line. Later it was used as a radio test vehicle; it is now stored, awaiting restoration.

2BG was destroyed in a Glenorchy level crossing smash, in 1971.

Composite First & Second Class sitting cars

10 cars were built between 1906 and 1909 at or near Newport Workshops, classed ABVE. The cars seated 23 first and 31 second class passengers in eight compartments. One Smoking compartment was located at each end of the carriage, adjacent to the two male lavatories, and two Ladies' compartments were in the middle, each connected directly to a centrally located Ladies lavatory (one of each class). As in the AVE and BVE cars, Ladies accessed their respective toilets from within each compartment, one seat having been omitted in lieu. Additionally, each car had a two-seat bench opposite the male toilets at each end, giving a total seating capacity of 58 passengers. In the 1910 re-coding the cars were re-lettered to ABE with original numbers retained; around this time a further 6 were built to the same design as numbers 11 to 16.

Nine of the cars were re-coded to BES in about 1960 (indicating slightly lesser capacity than a normal BE car), with a further four of the class scrapped between 1970 and 1982.

5ABE & 16ABE are preserved at Seymour Railway Heritage Centre while 3ABE & 7ABE are currently under the care of Steamrail Victoria. 12ABE was also under Steamrail's care, but everything above the frame was scrapped in 2008 after deteriorating markedly.

In preservation, 7ABE was fitted with a small kiosk as Steamrail's original snack bar carriage, until replaced by 14 BRS.

Second Class sitting cars

These carriages were built from 1906 with nine compartments, each seating 8 second-class passengers for a total of 72 along with a lavatory/wash basin arrangement at either end of each carriage. Like the AVE cars, the first four cars had two compartments at the Gentlemen's end were reserved for Smoking travellers, while another two compartments adjacent to the Ladies lavatory were reserved for ladies only; this was later reduced to one Ladies compartment, with the Non-Smoking compartment count increased from five to six. BVE cars numbered 5 and higher began their lives with two Smoking, 6 Non-Smoking, and 1 Ladies compartment each.

39 cars of this class were built initially; the majority were numbered 1BVE to 31BVE, although construction continued with cars 32 to 39 being released after the 1910 re-coding, so they started life as BE cars with the remainder of the class re-coded to join them. In 1923 a further four cars, 40BE to 43BE, were built to supplement 5BE to 10BE in the joint-stock arrangement.

The Joint Stock cars were built at the South Australian Railways' Islington Railway Workshops; the other 33 carriages were built at Newport, although about two-thirds of those were constructed by local contractors rather than Railway workers.

The new underframe had been fitted by 3 August 1931 at Islington, and the car was also fitted with external South Australian Railways drop-handle handbrake equipment on one of the corners, matching the style of van 1D.

At some point, 42BE was fitted with steel sheeting over the timber sides in an attempt to preserve them.

Cars 44 to 48BE were converted from BDSE mail sorting cars between 1922 and 1929 (see details below). Cars 49, 50, 51, & 52BE were former first class air-conditioned cars, re-classed when new steel carriages were introduced. 53BE to 61BE were converted from composite ABE cars during 1981, as the start of the transition from wooden stock to all steel cars and altered rostering of carriages into small fixed sets.

8BE was scrapped on 11 April 1958 following a side-swipe at Mount Barker in the early morning of 1 January 1958. The carriage was running in a train from Victor Harbor to Adelaide, hauled by engine 525, when it collided with the second division of the Adelaide to Melbourne Overland service.

To overcome problems with different seating capacities within the BE group, two suffixes were added to the class in 1982. Using the standard BE capacity of 72 passengers, cars with a greater capacity (76 passengers) were coded BEL and cars with less capacity (64 passengers) were coded BES. Cars listed as BEL were 44 to 47, while 50, 53, 55 to 61BE were re-classed to BES, same numbers, during 1982; it is likely that cars 52 & 54 were also re-lettered but records have not been found to confirm this. All these cars were withdrawn during 1983/1984 thanks to the introduction of the N sets.

One BE underframe was retained by the South Australian Railways for workshops use; the bogies and frame, including floor, were used to transfer heavy beams around the workshops until the late 1980s.

1BE, 14BE, 26BE, & 33BE are currently preserved at Seymour Railway Heritage Centre, 4BE, 17BE, 25BE, & 38BE along with 46BE (ex BDSE) are currently preserved with Steamrail Victoria while 2BE, 3BE, 29BE, & 30BE are stored; 15BE & 20BE were with the Victorian Goldfields Railway but were sold to Seymour Railway Heritage Centre and moved by rail to Seymour for restoration in late 2010. 19BE, 34BE, & 36BE were allocated to the South Gippsland Railway, and 42BE (constructed at Islington Railway Workshops, South Australia) is preserved at the National Railway Museum at Port Adelaide. 45BE (ex BDSE) has been named Hastings and is currently at Moorooduc on the Mornington Tourist Railway, along with 57BE & 58BE both ex ABE. 47BE (ex BDSE) is privately owned and at Seymour.

Guard's Vans

From 1906, construction of the DVE vans started. Originally this meant two fish-fitted vans were available for the Adelaide run and another two for the Albury run, but shortly after those services began the Newport pair were swapped for 5 & 6DVE, so that the Joint Stock (fish-fitted) series was 1 to 4, furthermore they were to be used exclusively on Adelaide services. Construction continued at Newport in much the same fashion until 1910, when the 17th van was classed CE, the previous 16 DVE vans being re-classed to same. The CE fleet continued to expand until 1911, with the last vehicle being 25 CE.

The first 25 DVE/CE vans were split into three subtypes.

The fleet was further expanded from 1923, with vans 26 to 32 built to the same design (numbers 26 & 27 were added to the Joint Stock fleet), as well as vans 33 to 37 built with an arched roof similar to the then-new W type carriage design, which were also fitted with four-wheel (two-axle), rather than six-wheel (three-axle) bogies.

Between 1926 and 1928, vans 11 to 14 had one of their guards' compartments removed at one end to make way for two transversely mounted coffin chambers. The end door was sealed as a result, but the vestibule connection remained.

In 1930, a collision at Seymour wrecked 15CE. A new van, also numbered 15CE, was built to the style of CE 33 to 37 instead of as the original 15CE.

From 1936 the Joint Stock carriages were being repainted in a green, black, and yellow scheme, but this program had to be cut short account the world war. Carriages were spotted in bright red from 1943, including 3CE & 26CE in the late 1940s.

The 1936 General Appendix specifies that CE type brake vans were absolutely banned from the Healesville line, but it does not specify why.

In 1963 35CE was modified for standard gauge service. It was reclassed to 1VHE: (V) Victoria; (H) (NSW guards van code); (E) (E-car van), although in 1969 the van was restored to its former identity.

Vans 35 CE & 36 CE spent some time with Vinelander stencils.

33CE was the only wooden vehicle to be painted in the VicRail orange 'Teacup' livery.

18CE, owned by Victrack, is currently serviceable thanks to the efforts of Steamrail Victoria. 31CE, also owned by Victrack, is currently under restoration by the Victorian Goldfields Railway. It is thought that both 13CE & 19CE were originally leased to Steamrail, but no record of either van has been seen since.

5CE is preserved in Bright at a museum at the former railway station, one of only two South Australian Railways-built E cars to survive. The bodies of 7 & 16CE were noted at Drouin, 8CE at Hallam, 10 & 21CE at Officer, 20CE at Hanging Rock, 23CE at Beaconsfield, 24CE at Warrnambool, 33CE at Gembrook, and 36CE at Yea.

Composite Second (sitting), Guard and Mail Sorting cars

A batch of ten ESBV carriages were built in 1909-1910, generally to the standard E design, but with about half the carriage devoted to mail sorting, for use on express trains on runs such as Melbourne to Bendigo. The cars had two seats at one end opposite the male lavatory, one smoking compartment, three standard, and one ladies' compartment, giving a total seating capacity of 41 passengers. The latter compartment had direct access to the ladies' lavatory from within the compartment, at the expense of one seat. The mail compartment contained a sorting desk with a pintsch-gas heated wax pot (for letter sealing), a cupboard, four seats and thirty-four pigeon holes on one side, with a framework for storage of sixty mail bags on the other. Besides the inter-carriage diaphragms, the mail sorting compartment was only accessible by a sliding door on each side of the carriage, much like those on DVE vans. 6 to 10ESBV were slightly different internally compared to 1 to 5ESBV — if looking from the mail sorting area towards the passenger area the corridor was on the right, rather than the left as in the first five cars.

After less than a year in traffic, the 1910 re-coding saw the ESBV vans re-lettered to BDSE.

In addition, three compartments were smoking and one non-smoking, a reversal of the former arrangement. Notably, all four compartments were now gentleman-exclusive. The external sliding doors near the middle of the car were not moved, but an additional pair of sliding doors were added at the non-passenger end of the carriages. The capacity of these cars was recorded as 36, but that didn't appear to count the two seats opposite the male lavatory. It is thought that these changes were made to allow for the reduced need to sort mail en route, as postal sorting capabilities increased.

Between 1922 and 1923, BDSE cars 8, 9, & 10 had their mail sorting facilities removed, being replaced by regular passenger compartments. The cars were renumbered to 44, 45, & 46BE respectively, joined by 3 & 5BDSE in 1929; these last two became 47 & 48BE.

In 1935, the remaining five BDSE carriages were converted from mail sorting use to combined passenger and baggage van use, as class BCE, renumbered 1 to 5 (from 4, 1, 2, 6, & 7 respectively). The change was in response to the spread of mail sorting facilities to country locations, in addition to reduced goods traffic on passenger trains. That meant that large guards vans such as the CE type were not as economic to run because they had no passenger capacity. The BCE cars kept their five passenger compartments, though the mail sorting section was completely stripped and the sides redesigned. The four double-windows and a sliding door were replaced by steel sides, a single door, and a sliding door. Cupolas were also added in the middle of the carriage, to allow guards to look over the roofs of the train.

All five BCE cars have been preserved:
1BCE - Steamrail Victoria
2BCE - Seymour Railway Heritage Centre, previously Victorian Goldfields Railway (not operational). Moved to Seymour for restoration in late 2010.
3BCE - Seymour Railway Heritage Centre
4BCE - Seymour Railway Heritage Centre (not operational)
5BCE - Steamrail Victoria (not operational)

Additionally, three former BDSE cars were saved as BE cars:
45BE (formerly 9BDSE) - Mornington Railway, serviceable
46BE (formerly 10BDSE) - Steamrail Victoria, owned by Victrack, serviceable
47BE (formerly 3BDSE) - Privately owned, being restored.

Mail storage vans
In 1907/8, two 60'2" mail vans were constructed by Newport Workshops as part of the E car order. They were classed as 1 & 2EEB and were externally similar to their DVE cousins, except that they lacked the guard's cupolas and vestibules at the end of the carriage . Rather, the EEB cars were entirely empty save for two internal semi-partitions for strength, to be used for the transport of twenty tons of mail only.

In the 1910 re-coding/renumbering the EEB vans were re-coded to 1 & 2D. In 1923 van 1D was destroyed in an accident at Glenorchy, however the number was reused on a new joint stock steel van in 1931; this van was similar internally but with a steel body, curved roof, as well as an extra ten tons of weight compensated by its 25-ton capacity. The new car was painted into the then-new hawthorn green Overland livery in 1935, later blue as a temporary van in the Spirit of Progress until the proper van was completed for inclusion in that train. During 1942-43 it was painted black, then from 1946 it was painted red before passing from Australian National to Steamranger.

In 1929 van 2D was destroyed in another accident, this time at Callington, SA. As a result, none of the non-vestibule E type carriages survived beyond that year.

Mail sorting vans
Along with the EEB cars another two 60'2" vans were constructed, but rather than merely storing the mail en route, these were designed for sorting of the mail with an onboard crew. Classed 1 & 2EES, these vans were fitted with facilities for storage for fifteen tons of mail bags, pigeon holes, and two desks each long enough for four mail sorting staff, along with a lavatory. One side of each van had three doors, while the other side had only two.

(A third EES car was converted from O 17 in 1908, although it was a completely different design and completely unrelated to the E series. Built in Adelaide in 1887, it became 3DS in 1910. In 1922 it was converted to a Way & Works car 4WW, but had been scrapped by 1938.)

In the 1910 re-coding the EES cars became 1 & 2DS (not to be confused with the DS van of the Spirit of Progress). In March 1928 they were converted to standard baggage cars and renumbered to 3 & 4D. In this identity they survived until 1973, when they were written off at Islington. The underframes with floors were recycled as workshop transfer vehicles, for shifting heavy loads around. They were also used at one point to transfer bridge beams, until one frame failed after being overloaded.

Dining cars

Parlor cars

Parlor cars Yarra and Murray were built in 1906 to the E car design, with an open observation car balcony at one end, along with a glass end window and lounge. They were used on the Sydney Limited until the introduction of the Spirit of Progress.

At the end of the train, the parlor cars had a -wide open balcony, equipped with folding chairs, surrounded with a wrought-iron fence at waist height and gates (usually kept locked) on either side. A glass pane separated the balcony from the -long observation room, with three large windows on either side, twelve comfortable armchairs, and a fixed bench seating three. Over that was a bookshelf for passengers' convenience. A corridor ran along the right-hand-side of the carriage, with four compartments adjacent. Respectively, they were the special (private) compartment, a ladies' compartment with the adjacent ladies' toilet (accessed, unusually for the design, from the corridor rather than directly from the compartment), as well as the conductor's compartment, which also contained limited space for luggage and supplies. The latter compartment was retrofitted with external swinging doors to assist with loading of goods. Beyond the corridor was a  smoking compartment with one long window on each side and five chairs identical to those of the observation compartment. The smoking compartment had a door on each side opening to the platform, although one of the chairs had to be moved if the platform was on the compartment side rather than the corridor side. A short central corridor led to the inter-carriage vestibule, with a gentlemen's lavatory split over both sides: the toilet on the corridor side and the wash basin on the compartment side.

All 33 passengers paid an additional parlor car fare on top of the fare for a reserved, first-class seat.

Murray was operational until the 1950s, when it was removed from bogies and placed in the North Melbourne yards as a classroom for staff. In the early 1960s, the body was demolished and burned.

Yarra was restored by the Australian Railway Historical Society in the 1960s and remains in service today.

State Car No.4 was built in 1912 to a similar exterior design, although the internal fitments were replaced to effectively make the carriage a travelling hotel, with some sleeping compartments.

Yarra and State Car No.4 are both held at the Seymour Railway Heritage Centre.

Sleeping cars

In service

First delivery phase (1906-1913)

Melbourne to Albury (Sydney)
From the beginning, the E cars were organised into fairly fixed consists, as demonstrated by their delivery dates. 28 August and 30 October 1906 each had the release of an AVE-AVE-AVBE-BVE-BVE-DVE consist, with the accompanying Parlor cars released to service a few months later; Yarra on 31 October and Murray on 19 December 1906. These trains ran from Melbourne to Albury, connecting to the New South Wales express trains to Sydney at Albury station. All of these cars save for Murray had been released to service by the 1906 Melbourne Cup.

Originally, these trains were intended to run with the DVE van adjacent to the locomotive tender, followed by the second class, first class and Parlor car portions; however, for the first few years the DVE ran between the last First Class and the Parlor car. It has been speculated that this may have been due to management and unions being uncomfortable with the concept of the guard being so far from the end of the train (which he was supposed to protect).

Melbourne to Adelaide
The second batch of E cars consisted of twenty-four vehicles; six AVE and BVE cars, four Sleeping cars and DVE vans, and two EEB and EES vans. The SAR built 9 of the cars plus one underframe at Islington Workshops to cover 40% of the construction cost (as agreed between the SAR and VR commissioners), though the body of this tenth car was constructed at Newport.

Victorian country services
After provision of carriages for the Adelaide and Albury services, Victoria chose to continue construction of the E fleet in order to replace older carriages on some of its principal intrastate routes. For this purpose, a further 28 AVE/AE, 14 ABVE/ABE, 29 BVE/BE, 3 Dining, 19 DVE/CE, and 10 ESBV/BDSE cars were constructed. By the end of the 1912/13 financial year, these cars in conjunction with the W cars were being used on trains to and through Ararat, Ballarat, Bendigo, Cobram, Geelong, Maryborough, Port Albert and Wangaratta among others.

The ESBV and EES cars were used for sorting of mail en route, so as to reduce the load on smaller post offices which would not have had the staff required for such a task. Other than the above mentioned Adelaide express train with its EES vans, the ESBV cars were usually utilised on services to Albury, Adelaide (on a regular passenger service), Bacchus Marsh-Ballarat-Stawell, Bendigo, Cobram, Melbourne-Geelong-Ballarat, Port Albert, Port Fairy, and Sale-Maffra-Bairnsdale.

Second delivery phase (1919-1938)
By 1919 the demand for sleeping cars skyrocketed on the Melbourne-Adelaide train; this was due to a lack of watercraft still in serviceable condition after World War 1, in addition to the recent opening of the then-new Trans-Australian line from Port Augusta to Kalgoorlie and on to Perth. Four new sleeping cars were constructed to a similar design, although these had upgrades in the form of electric lighting (the first in the E fleet), and a different form of seat/berth design so that the seat backs were not used in the beds.

Demand steadily increased over the next few years, and by the early 1920s it had reached a point where even more carriages were required. This resulted in the 1923 construction of another six sleeping cars, four first- and four second-class passenger carriages and 2 CE vans for Joint Stock service, plus another five CE vans for regular service. Once again Islington Workshops were called upon to provide a fair share on construction and associated costs, so the BE and CE Joint Stock cars were built there, with the Sleeper and AE cars built at Newport.

A year later another five CE vans had been out-shopped by Newport Workshops, bringing the total of that class to 32. In 1924 another five were assembled, giving the CE total of 37 vehicles. These five were built with arch roofs between their cupolas, but were otherwise similar to the remainder of their class.

By the end of their second decade in service the class as a whole had undergone some modifications; most cars were fitted with electric lighting, half the BDSE fleet had been converted to BE cars and both DS cars were converted to D type vans due to the declining requirements for on-train mail sorting.

The final E type carriage to be constructed was 15CE in July 1930, replacing the previous 15CE which had been destroyed in January of that year. The new 15CE was also given the same arch roof as 33 to 37CE.

From 1935 the E fleet started to gain automatic couplers, along with strengthened underframes, anti-telescoping beams at either end, air-conditioning and rubber pads in the bogies to reduce vibration and noise. 36AE was the first pure-sitting car in the British Empire to be fitted with this system; other non-VR cars had been fitted previously, but these were all at least partial buffet or sleeping cars. Notably, 36AE had almost-full-length ducts for the air conditioning system on either side of its clerestory roof; this gave a similar appearance to the curved roof carriages.

In 1937, AE cars 21, 26, & 34 were to be converted to buffet cars of a similar internal arrangement to the previously existing buffet cars; only one buffet car was completed (named Taggerty in 1939) due to World War 2, with the other two cars later converted to partial buffets and named Kiewa (ex 21AE) and Moyne (ex 26AE). These latter two were released to service in 1955 on the Warrnambool and Horsham lines. They were also the last E cars to be fitted with air conditioning.

By the late 1930s, the 13 air-conditioned E cars (1, 3, 12, 36AE; 4, 19, 31, 34BE; Sleepers 1 to 4, and Taggerty) were rostered with one or two sitting cars to the Albury Express, one sleeping car to the Overland, and three cars (Sleeper-AE-BE set) to all Mildura Overnight trains. Around this time, all the Sleepers lost their names, to be replaced with "Sleeper No.X". The three newest Sleepers became No.1 to 3, and the older sleepers occupied numbers 4 to 10; Angas, Baderloo, Barwon, Finnis, Glenelg, Onkaparinga, Tambo, and Torrens were not renumbered, with many of these sold to the SAR in the early 1950s.

In 1936 the Overland cars were painted in a green, black, & yellow scheme to match the express passenger engines of the South Australian Railways.

World War II and aftermath (1938-1949)
With the outbreak of the second world war, the E fleet, along with the rest of the Victorian Railways, was placed under great strain.

In 1938 Wimmera was removed from dining car service for alteration to the Medical and Vision Test Car. It ran around Victoria as part of its own train with an onboard doctor, supplying medical testing facilities to Victorian Railways staff, and occasionally to local towns as well.

Special purpose cars, such as the Medical and Vision Test car, the Parlor Cars and Taggerty were placed into deep storage around the state, because they were of little use to the war effort and there was no remaining capacity for special-event trains to operate. Goulburn was stored at Ballarat, for example. A number of E cars were loaned to the SAR during the war and for a time afterwards, to cover a shortfall of rolling stock on their system. Furthermore, Campaspe and Sleeper No.5 joined 12 cars of other types in a military troop train. The war's lack of maintenance also resulted in the Joint Stock vehicles being repainted from their 1936 Hawthorn Green scheme to the standard VR red from 1943.

Carriages from the joint-stock fleet were repainted to match the rest of the system during this period, because austerity measures required temporary abolition of decorative additions. In the late 1940s, 7BE, 3CE, 26CE, 1D, & 4D were all spotted in red; 3D had been red in 1944 but plain black in 1945, while 1D was black between 1944-1945 then red from 1946 on.

During the War and the aftermath, the South Australian Railways hired some of the E type carriages to bolster their fleet. By 1950 the cars included were 4AE, 11AE, 13AE, & 14AE. The South Australian Railways' country train plan from 20 February 1944 shows 19AE-781-706-605-600-11AE-13AE as one consist forming a Victor Harbor run, and also includes reference to 4AE. It is possible that this arrangement continued until the SAR purchased the Victorian Railways' share in 7AE & 8AE, except that during the October 1952 long weekend they also hired 42BE, and in February 1954 they hired 9AE to replace a 500 class passenger car in one of their West-East express consists.

The Overland, the Standard Gauge and the Blue & Gold (1949-1967)
When the new steel carriages were introduced for The Overland from 1949, the joint-stock E Type carriage fleet was split among the VR and SAR. The South Australian Railways purchased the Victorian Railways' equity in some cars and vice versa for others By 1969 the whole fleet had been split, with Barwon and Glenelg scrapped, Baderloo sold, Torrens preserved, Angas, Dargo, Finnis, Onkaparinga, and Tambo going to the South Australian Railways, while Buchan, Wando, Acheron, Coliban, Inman, Pekina, and Loddon went to the Victorian Railways.

Little changed at the end of the war as it took many years to catch up on the backlog of maintenance. In 1949 Taggerty was restored to the Bendigo train after a seven-year absence. In 1954 Queen Elizabeth II and the Duke of Edinburgh travelled around Australia, their Royal train in Victoria included E cars State No.4, Goulburn, and 34CE, in addition to State No.5, the Dining Car from the Spirit of Progress, Avoca, and three AS cars. This made State 4, Goulburn, and 34CE the first E cars to be painted in VR Blue & Gold, shortly followed by Kiewa and Moyne as mentioned above.

From the late 1950s a number of CE vans, in addition to the air conditioned sitting AE and BE cars, were painted into Blue and Gold, perhaps to reflect their higher status. The program started with 17CE, 35CE, & 36CE in 1957, while the first sitting car to be treated as such was 1AE in 1959. Four years later the program was completed, with the repainting of Taggerty. Also from 1959, over 100 carriages were fitted with upgraded axle generators to strengthen their internal lighting, as well as allowing the older-style generators to be cascaded to the PL carriages. All BCE and ABE cars were altered, along with most of the Joint Stock vehicles (excluding the Joint Stock CE's), and the majority of the remaining AE and BE fleet.

With the 1962 completion of the new standard gauge line from Wodonga to Melbourne, a large portion of the S and Z fleet of steel carriages were lost to the new services on that line and the VR realised that this would create a shortfall of air conditioned rollingstock on the broad gauge. In a proactive move in 1961, Kiewa and Moyne were altered to 1 & 2BG, receiving saloon-style seating where their restaurant fittings had been but retaining the three original compartments at one end. 1BG was noted exclusively on Yarram trains from 1971 until 1986, when it was withdrawn, although its traffic history before this period is not known.

As broad gauge steel cars were converted to standard gauge, they received Commonwealth bogies, and their old bogies cascaded to E type carriages. Cars fitted with four-wheel bogies were 1 to 4, 11, 13, 17 to 19, 23 to 25, 28, 30, 35, 36, 38 AE; 4, 19, 31, 34 BE; in addition to Kiewa, Moyne, Taggerty, 15, & 33 to 37CE as noted above.

Also around this time, the four air conditioned AE cars (36, 1, 3, 12) were renumbered to 49 to 52BE respectively; the air-conditioned fleet of E type carriages now comprising 4, 19, 31, 34, 49, 50, 51, 52 BE; 1, 2 BG; Sleepers 1 to 4, and Taggerty.

In 1962, 35CE was converted to standard gauge and re-coded to 1VHE (No.1, Victorian, Guard's Van, E type respectively), and it was used as a spare van for standard gauge services until 1969 when it was converted back to broad gauge. At this time it regained its original identity of 35CE. This is the only E type carriage to ever have served on a gauge other than broad.

In 1966 30CE among others had new windows with rubber surrounds fitted and the sliding doors to the guards' compartments at each end were replaced with outward-swinging doors. Although 30CE was not the only van to undergo this alteration, it is not known how many other vans were altered in the same way.

Final phase of Overland stock delivery (1967-1980)
From 1968 a handful of Joint Stock cars were repainted from VR passenger red to SAR red/brown. Known numbers are 42AE, 41BE, 42BE, & 27CE.

In 1970 the Victorian Railways decided to eliminate the Second Class category from its rollingstock fleet, as part of a modernisation program. At this time all references to Second Class were eliminated; however passenger confusion resulted in new Economy decals being applied from 1972, starting with composite vehicles.

As steel sitting cars were introduced on The Overland, the sitting E type carriages were replaced, condemned, and withdrawn from service. Mail van 1D had been destroyed at Glenorchy in 1923, while the 1929 Callington derailment had claimed earlier Joint Stock vehicles 5AE, 9BE, & 2D.

The next to go were 7AE & 8AE, given to the South Australian Railways in 1952 after 1AJ & 2AJ entered service in their place. The pair were renumbered 550 & 551, and painted in the South Australian Railways' livery of primrose & hawthorn. In 1963 the pair were sold to the Commonwealth Railways; 550 was never used, and scrapped in 1976. Over the next few months the frame converted to a flat wagon R2604 and fitted with crew camp units S179 & S180; it was written off in 1993. 551 was converted to the Commonwealth Railways' Theaterette Car and reclassified W144. In 1985 it was further converted to OWB144 as the Community Service Car, until withdrawal in 1987. In 1988 it was purchased by the Ghan Preservation Society, and stored at Port Augusta until shifting to Alice Springs; it was sighted there on 3'6" bogies in 1996 and 2008.

In 1959 8BE was destroyed in a crash in South Australia. The next to be withdrawn were Glenelg, Barwon, 5BE, 40BE, & 43BE from the Joint Stock fleet in 1967, and these were scrapped at Islington workshops, followed by the VR-owned E-type carriages 17AE, 11BE, & 9ABE in 1970.

2BG was destroyed in a collision at Glenorchy in 1971.

41BE was condemned in 1972 and stored in 1974 awaiting scrapping, also at Islington. Around the same time, 1CE, 2CE, 3CE, 4CE, 26CE, 27CE, 3D, & 4D were all withdrawn, and condemned/scrapped over the following year. 3D & 4D were withdrawn from the Overland but kept in service, occasionally being used on mail trains to and from Port Pirie. When they were finally withdrawn from that service the bodies were scrapped, but the underframes and bogies were retained for movements around workshop sites of beams and other heavy loads; the frame (with floor) and bogies from an unidentified BE carriage were also used for this purpose. The frames are also thought to have been used for beam transfers during road overbridge replacements, until one of the frames was overloaded and folded.

In late 1973 the SAR restricted the use of E type carriages on regular services, so that when they were running they were limited to 80 km/h (50 mph); the VR re-acted with similar restrictions to Joint Stock running on the Victorian system. This reduced the usefulness of the affected carriages, resulting in 6AE, 9AE, 10AE, 39AE, 40AE, 41AE, 42AE, 6BE, 7BE, 10BE, & 42BE being condemned in 1974. 10AE, 6BE, 7BE, & 10BE were scrapped at Newport Workshops in 1976, around the same time as 40AE & 42AE; the others at undetermined times and locations. 40AE had been sold in 1975, so its scrapping in 1976 is unusual. The frame and bogies from 39AE were eventually sold to West Coast Railway, then when that company folded in 2004 they were on-sold. 42BE was held until 1975, then placed in the Mile End Rail Museum in South Australia. In 1988 it was moved with the rest of the rollingstock to the Port Dock Station Museum, now known as the National Railway Museum.

A handful of CE vans (15 & 30 to 33) had experimental LP-gas heating installed in lieu of footwarmers; this new system operated by heating water that was circulated around the vans' through pipes. 37CE was similarly modified in 1978, though its boiler was heated with diesel fuel rather than LP gas.

By the end of the 1970s, less than 40 E type carriages were required on a daily basis. Although the figures are guides only, Albury, Cobram, Traralgon and Warrnambool each ran with BE-BE-CE (though to Warrnambool had an additional ABE);  Bairnsdale with BE-CE; Ballarat with only 1 BE; Bendigo with a single CE van; Dimboola with ABE-BE-CE; Seymour with a single ABE; Swan Hill with an ABE, a CE and Taggerty; and Yarram ran with only 1BG. Only Geelong had anything more than dregs leftover, with 5 AE cars, 2 BE cars, 2 ABE cars, and 2 BCE cars in service.

New Deal and the abolition of wooden rollingstock (1981-1991)
With the 'New Deal', major reductions were made in the E type fleet as new N sets were introduced to service, along with service acceleration and closing of many stations around the Victorian network. Carriages in the poorest condition were withdrawn almost immediately, with remaining cars organised into fixed consists; some of those included air-conditioned carriages. Around this time changes to the BE fleet coding were undertaken, to better reflect their internal capacity. Cars converted from BDSE in the 1920s became BEL, while cars converted from AE and ABE carriages became BES. Notably, only a handful of these carriages were re-lettered, although official publications recognised the new codes. However, cars 51 & 52BE were coded back to 51 & 52AE (not reclaiming their original numbers); it is not known if these cars held the BES code at all, although it is unlikely.

Furthermore, all the airconditioned cars received minor improvements, such as carpeting and paper headrests. Taggerty was allowed to operate on all lines, presumably as a backup vehicle for when a BRS car was unavailable. 33CE was repainted into Vicrail 'teacup' orange, being the only wooden vehicle to receive the new livery.

In 1983 the E cars used in the Train of Knowledge were refurbished, being re-released to service in May 1984. The train consisted of Sleeping cars 5 to 10, as well as W type dining car Avoca and the non-E-type carriages Carey, Melville, and Moorabool.

The final run of non-air-conditioned E sitting cars came in 1985, after the delivery of the H cars, as 14BE ran in the 7:52 am Bacchus Marsh to Spencer Street pass on Friday, 30 August 1985. This left only the air-conditioned sitting cars, the non-air-conditioned sleeping cars in the Train Of Knowledge, the air-conditioned sleeping cars kept as a backup for the Mildura overnight train, with Goulburn and Wimmera. By August 1989 the count had reduced further when all sleeping cars were withdrawn, leaving only the eight E cars equipped with air conditioning (4, 19, 31, & 34BE; 50BES; 51 & 52AE; 1BG) still in service. The last regular train worked with E class cars was the 5:40 pm V/Line South Geelong service on 24 December 1991.

The first Informal E set - 19BE-31BE-34BE-51AE - was sandwiched between van 7CD and Norman for the Albury trip on Sat 14 November 1987, celebrating the 50th anniversary of the Spirit of Progress. Otherwise, the two sets were generally only used for Geelong weekday peak runs.

Preservation era (1991-current)
1BG was retained by the Public Transport Cooperation for testing of new safeworking systems. The other seven sitting cars were withdrawn and stored, along with Wimmera when it was decided to use local doctors rather than running the medical and vision test train. Goulburn was kept in service but saw little to no regular use, and in 1994 it was allocated to Steamrail. Otherwise, by the 1990s the only E type carriages still of any relevance to V/Line Passenger were of the Classic Carriage fleet; 2AE, 30AE and Yarra.

In 1989, carriages 2AE, 30AE, 1BE, 14BE, 3BCE, & Yarra were listed as restored to the dark red with yellow dots scheme by the Seymour Loco Steam Preservation Group, with 26BE a potential addition to the consist.

By the early 1990s V/Line declared no interest whatsoever in the wooden carriages. As listed above, the E type cars have been dispersed among various preservation groups and private owners.

59 E type carriages remain, around half statically preserved and the rest either operational or undergoing restoration. Going back to the 1910 codes, 9 AE cars survive along with 5 ABE cars, 17 BE cars, 8 BDSE cars, 3 CE vans, 1 D van, 11 Sleeping cars, Wimmera, Goulburn, Campaspe, Yarra, and State Car No.4.

Additionally, 16BE has been restored as a café at Seville - www.worldisround.com/articles/376216/photo7.html

Seymour Railway Heritage Centre - 2AE, 30AE, 5ABE, 16ABE, 1BE, 14BE, 3BCE, State Car 4, & Parlor Car Yarra

Steamrail Victoria - 3ABE, 7ABE, 12AE, 1BCE, 4BE, 17BE, 25BE, 38BE, 46BE, & 18CE

Model railways

HO Scale
As of March 2012, only HO scale plastic models of the E-series carriages are available (although there have been brass models released in the past). Kits produced by Steam Era Models can be kitbashed into AE, ABE and BE types, while End of the Line Hobbies in South Australia are selling made-up kits plus BCE and Sleeping varieties. Auscision Models have released a range of "ready-to-run" models.

Auscision
Models are available in VR Heritage Brown (AE, ABE, BE, CE), VR Red (AE with 4-wheel bogies, ABE, BE) and VR Blue (CE only). They are sold as single carriages or as sets of four and arranged by age, with sets from 1921–1954, 1954–1963, 1963–1971, & 1971–1985. In April 2020, Auscision announced a 3rd Rerun of the E Cars with new Overland sets, a Heritage Red and a Steamrail Victoria Set.

Trainbuilder
Trainbuilder has produced a brass range of the rarer E Type carriages.

Steam Era Models
Steam Era Models produces a kit for the E type carriages, utilising components from the W type kits and new, six-wheel bogies. Construction requires something of a kitbash, with the sides, roof and underframe from two W cars merged to form one E car shell.

Strath Hobbies
Strath Hobbies, over the years, has produced a range of E type kits utilising a mix of new resin components, custom decals, and raw parts from the Steam Era Models range, depending on the type. The range includes air-conditioning units and curved roof units, with complete kits for the mail storage cars 1D & 2D. Previously the range included other types, like the dining, restaurant, and parlor cars.

References

Specific

 August/September 1996 Newsrail, '90 Years of the E cars in Victoria' by Chris Banger and Peter Medlin
 Peter J. Vincent: ABVE / ABE - 1st/2nd Express Sitting Carriage
 Peter J. Vincent: DVE / CE / VHE - Bogie Express Guards Van
 Peter J. Vincent: BCE - 2nd Class Car/Van
 Peter J. Vincent: AVE / AE - First Class Express Carriage
 Peter J. Vincent: BVE / BE / BEL / BES - Express Second Class Car
 Mark Bau: BG - economy, aircon, saloon/compartment cars

Victorian Railways carriages